Environ or environs may refer to:

 Environ (Loft), a New York performance space
 Ramboll Environ, or ENVIRON, a consulting firm in Arlington, Virginia
 Environs (journal), a student-run law review covering environmental subjects 
 Environs, or surroundings, the area around a given physical or geographical point or place

See also

 
 
 Environment (disambiguation)